Mykola Ivanovich Kmit (born March 24, 1966) is a Ukrainian politician and the former head of the Lviv Oblast State Administration. He is a president of the Ukrainian football club FC Skala Stryi (originally from Morshyn).

Biography

Business career 
A graduate of the Lviv Polytechnic Institute, during 1992-1995 under Mr. Kmit's management the Invest-Center JSC became a large wholesale supplier of the Ukrainian china and ceramic ware to Russia.

From 1996 till 2004 Mykola Kmit led Nova company specializing in mineral water production and bottling in Morshyn. His leadership resulted in the establishing of the biggest distribution network in Ukraine.

Since 2005 till February 2008, Mykola Kmit is a top-manager, co-owner and strategist of the Industrial and Distribution Systems (IDS). Under his management several new factories were launched and IDS Group became the leader in the Ukrainian mineral water market.

Political career 
In February, 2008 Mykola Kmit became an acting Head of Lviv Oblast State Administration.
By a Decree of President Viktor Yushchenko of September 1, 2008, Mykola Kmit was appointed the Head of Lviv Oblast State Administration. Today Mr. Kmit focuses his efforts on developing the investment potential of Lviv Region and implementation of vital projects, including those related to Euro 2012, for the region's growth and well-being. Kmit was dismissed in April 2010 by President Viktor Yanukovych.

Candidate for People's Deputies of Ukraine from the Samopomich Party in constituency No. 126 in the early elections of October 26, 2014.

Kmit took part in the July 2019 Ukrainian parliamentary election with the party Self Reliance on its national election list. But in the election the party won 1 seat (in one of the electoral constituencies) while only scoring 0.62% of the national (election list) vote.

In 2007, Mykola Kmit took 69th place in the TOP-100 best managers in the country, having previously become a finalist in the International Competition Entrepreneur of the Year 2006.

Candidate for People's Deputies of Ukraine from the Samopomich Party in constituency № 126 in the early elections on October 26, 2014.

Candidate for People's Deputies from Samopomіch in the 2019 parliamentary elections, №8 on the list. Non-partisan.

References

External links 
 Mykola Kmit: Business tools are effective in public administration.  
 Ukraine's road to 2012 remains rocky as cities face stadium scrap, article in The Guardian by Jonathan Wilson (May 5, 2009)

1966 births
Living people
People from Buchach
Ukrainian businesspeople
Governors of Lviv Oblast
Self Reliance (political party) politicians
Lviv Polytechnic alumni
Ukrainian football chairmen and investors
FC Skala Stryi (2004)